Victor Vito is the Two Tomatoes Records and Columbia Records album by children's musician Laurie Berkner. It was released in Canada on February 23, 1999, and in the U.S. on January 1, 2001. It won a Children's Music Web award in 2000.

Track listing 
"Victor Vito"
"Bottle Caps"
"Moon, Moon, Moon"
"Froggie Went a-Courtin'"
"I'm Not Perfect"
"The Toy Museum"
"O Susannah"
"Boots"
"Oleanna"
"The Crabs"
"Sneaks"
"The Goldfish"
"Zodiac"
"Trucks"
"Fruit Salad Salsa"
"The Story of My Feelings"
"I Feel Crazy So I Jump in the Soup"
"Shakin' Down the Sugar"
"Googleheads"
"Tingolayo"
"White Coral Bells"
"Goodnight"

Production 

 Recorded at: Hoboken Curve Studio, Hoboken, NJ

References 

1999 albums
Laurie Berkner albums
Columbia Records albums